Progressivism in the United States is a political philosophy and reform movement in the United States advocating policies that are generally considered left-wing, left-wing populist, democratic socialist, libertarian socialist, social democratic, and environmentalist. In mainstream American politics, progressives generally advocate a universal healthcare system, wage equity and labor rights, economic justice, social justice, opposition to the military–industrial complex, an increase in corporate regulation, the abolition of capital punishment, and action on climate change.

It reached its height early in the 20th century. Middle/working class and reformist in nature, it arose as a response to the vast changes brought by modernization such as the growth of large corporations, pollution and corruption in American politics.

Historian Alonzo Hamby describes American progressivism as a "political movement that addresses ideas, impulses, and issues stemming from modernization of American society. Emerging at the end of the nineteenth century, it established much of the tone of American politics throughout the first half of the century".

In the 21st century, the term is often used to describe proponents of social justice and environmentalism. While the modern progressive movement may be characterized as largely secular in nature, by comparison, the historical progressive movement was to a significant extent rooted in and energized by religion.

Progressive Era 

Historians debate the exact contours, but they generally date the Progressive Era in response to the excesses of the Gilded Age from the 1890s to either World War I or the onset of the Great Depression. Many of the core principles of the progressive movement focused on the need for efficiency in all areas of society, and for greater democratic control over public policy. Purification to eliminate waste and corruption was a powerful element as well as the progressives' support of worker compensation, improved child labor laws, minimum wage legislation, a limited workweek, graduated income tax and allowing women the right to vote. Arthur S. Link and Vincent P. De Santis argue that the majority of progressives wanted to purify politics. For some Progressives, purification meant taking the vote away from blacks in the South.

Regulation of large corporations and monopolies 

Many progressives hoped that by regulating large corporations they could liberate human energies from the restrictions imposed by industrial capitalism. Nonetheless, the progressive movement was split over which of the following solutions should be used to regulate corporations.

Trust busting 
Pro-labor progressives such as Samuel Gompers argued that industrial monopolies were unnatural economic institutions which suppressed the competition which was necessary for progress and improvement. United States antitrust law is the body of laws that prohibits anti-competitive behavior (monopoly) and unfair business practices. Presidents such as Theodore Roosevelt and William Howard Taft supported trust-busting. During their presidencies, the otherwise-conservative Taft brought down 90 trusts in four years while Roosevelt took down 44 in seven and a half years in office.

Regulation 
Progressives such as Benjamin Parke De Witt argued that in a modern economy, large corporations and even monopolies were both inevitable and desirable. With their massive resources and economies of scale, large corporations offered the United States advantages which smaller companies could not offer. However, these large corporations might abuse their great power. The federal government should allow these companies to exist, but otherwise regulate them for the public interest. President Roosevelt generally supported this idea and was later to incorporate it as part of his "New Nationalism".

Efficiency 
Many progressives such as Louis Brandeis hoped to make American governments better able to serve the people's needs by making governmental operations and services more efficient and rational. Rather than making legal arguments against ten-hour workdays for women, he used "scientific principles" and data produced by social scientists documenting the high costs of long working hours for both individuals and society. The progressives' quest for efficiency was sometimes at odds with the progressives' quest for democracy. Taking power out of the hands of elected officials and placing that power in the hands of professional administrators reduced the voice of the politicians and in turn reduced the voice of the people. Centralized decision-making by trained experts and reduced power for local wards made government less corrupt but more distant and isolated from the people it served. Progressives who emphasized the need for efficiency typically argued that trained independent experts could make better decisions than the local politicians. In his influential Drift and Mastery (1914) stressing the "scientific spirit" and "discipline of democracy", Walter Lippmann called for a strong central government guided by experts rather than public opinion.

One example of progressive reform was the rise of the city manager system in which paid, professional engineers ran the day-to-day affairs of city governments under guidelines established by elected city councils. Many cities created municipal "reference bureaus" which did expert surveys of government departments looking for waste and inefficiency. After in-depth surveys, local and even state governments were reorganized to reduce the number of officials and to eliminate overlapping areas of authority between departments. City governments were reorganized to reduce the power of local ward bosses and to increase the powers of the city council. Governments at every level began developing budgets to help them plan their expenditures rather than spending money haphazardly as needs arose and revenue became available. Governor Frank Lowden of Illinois showed a "passion for efficiency" as he streamlined state government.

Governmental corruption 
Corruption represented a source of waste and inefficiency in the government. William Simon U'Ren in Oregon, Robert M. La Follette in Wisconsin and others worked to clean up state and local governments by passing laws to weaken the power of machine politicians and political bosses. In Wisconsin, La Follette pushed through an open primary system that stripped party bosses of the power to pick party candidates. The Oregon System included a "Corrupt Practices Act", a public referendum and a state-funded voter's pamphlet, among other reforms which were exported to other states in the Northwest and Midwest. Its high point was in 1912, after which they detoured into a disastrous third party status.

Education 
Early progressive thinkers such as John Dewey and Lester Ward placed a universal and comprehensive system of education at the top of the progressive agenda, reasoning that if a democracy were to be successful, its leaders, the general public, needed a good education. Progressives worked hard to expand and improve public and private education at all levels. They believed that modernization of society necessitated the compulsory education of all children, even if the parents objected. Progressives turned to educational researchers to evaluate the reform agenda by measuring numerous aspects of education, later leading to standardized testing. Many educational reforms and innovations generated during this period continued to influence debates and initiatives in American education for the remainder of the 20th century. One of the most apparent legacies of the Progressive Era left to American education was the perennial drive to reform schools and curricula, often as the product of energetic grass-roots movements in the city.

Since progressivism was and continues to be "in the eyes of the beholder", progressive education encompasses very diverse and sometimes conflicting directions in educational policy. Such enduring legacies of the Progressive Era continue to interest historians. Progressive Era reformers stressed "object teaching", meeting the needs of particular constituencies within the school district, equal educational opportunity for boys and girls and avoiding corporal punishment.

David Gamson examines the implementation of progressive reforms in three city school districts—Denver, Colorado, Seattle, Washington and Oakland, California—during 1900–1928. Historians of educational reform during the Progressive Era tend to highlight the fact that many progressive policies and reforms were very different and at times even contradictory. At the school district level, contradictory reform policies were often especially apparent, though there is little evidence of confusion among progressive school leaders in  Denver, Seattle and Oakland. District leaders in these cities, including Frank B. Cooper in Seattle and Fred M. Hunter in Oakland, often employed a seemingly contradictory set of reforms. Local progressive educators consciously sought to operate independently of national progressive movements as they preferred reforms that were easy to implement and were encouraged to mix and blend diverse reforms that had been shown to work in other cities.

The reformers emphasized professionalization and bureaucratization. The old system whereby ward politicians selected school employees was dropped in the case of teachers and replaced by a merit system requiring a college-level education in a normal school (teacher's college). The rapid growth in size and complexity the large urban school systems facilitated stable employment for women teachers and provided senior teachers greater opportunities to mentor younger teachers. By 1900, most women in Providence, Rhode Island, remained as teachers for at least 17.5 years, indicating teaching had become a significant and desirable career path for women.

Social work 
Progressives set up training programs to ensure that welfare and charity work would be undertaken by trained professionals rather than warm-hearted amateurs.

Jane Addams of Chicago's Hull House typified the leadership of residential, community centers operated by social workers and volunteers and located in inner city slums. The purpose of the settlement houses was to raise the standard of living of urbanites by providing adult education and cultural enrichment programs.

Anti-prostitution 
During this era of massive reformation among all social aspects, elimination of prostitution was vital for the progressives, especially the women.

Enactment of child labor laws 

Child labor laws were designed to prevent the overuse of children in the newly emerging industries. The goal of these laws was to give working class children the opportunity to go to school and mature more institutionally, thereby liberating the potential of humanity and encouraging the advancement of humanity. Factory owners generally did not want this progression because of lost workers. Parents relied on the income of children to keep the family solvent.  Progressives enacted state and federal laws against child labor, but these were overturned by the US Supreme Court. A proposed constitutional amendment was opposed by business and Catholics; it passed Congress but was never ratified by enough states. Child labor was finally outlawed by the New Deal in the 1930s.

Support for the goals of organized labor 
Labor unions grew steadily until 1916, then expanded fast during the war. In 1919, a wave of major strikes alienated the middle class and the strikes were lost which alienated the workers. In the 1920s, the unions were in the doldrums. In 1924, they supported Robert M. La Follette's Progressive Party, but he only carried his base in Wisconsin. The American Federation of Labor under Samuel Gompers after 1907 began supporting the Democrats, who promised more favorable judges as the Republicans appointed pro-business judges. Theodore Roosevelt and his third party also supported such goals as the eight-hour work day, improved safety and health conditions in factories, workers' compensation laws and minimum wage laws for women.

Prohibition 
Most progressives, especially in rural areas, adopted the cause of prohibition. They saw the saloon as political corruption incarnate and bewailed the damage done to women and children. They believed the consumption of alcohol limited mankind's potential for advancement. Progressives achieved success first with state laws then with the enactment of the Eighteenth Amendment to the United States Constitution in 1919. The golden day did not dawn as enforcement was lax, especially in the cities where the law had very limited popular support and where notorious criminal gangs such as the Chicago gang of Al Capone made a crime spree based on illegal sales of liquor in speakeasies. The "experiment" (as President Herbert Hoover called it) also cost the federal and local treasuries large sums of taxes. The 18th amendment was repealed by the Twenty-first Amendment to the United States Constitution in 1933.

Eugenics 
Some progressives sponsored eugenics as a solution to excessively large or under-performing families, hoping that birth control would enable parents to focus their resources on fewer, better children while others, like Margaret Sanger advocated it. Progressive leaders such as Herbert Croly and Walter Lippmann indicated their classical liberal concern over the danger posed to the individual by the practice of eugenics. Progressive politician William Jennings Bryan opposed eugenics on the grounds of his anti-evolution activism.

Purifying the electorate 
Progressives repeatedly warned that illegal voting was corrupting the political system. They especially identified big-city bosses, working with saloon keepers and precinct workers, as the culprits who stuffed the ballot boxes. The solution to purifying the vote included prohibition (designed to close down the saloons), voter registration requirements (designed to end multiple voting), and literacy tests (designed to minimize the number of ignorant voters).

All of the Southern states used devices to disenfranchise black voters during the Progressive Era. Typically, the progressive elements in those states pushed for disenfranchisement, often fighting against the conservatism of the Black Belt whites. A major reason given was that whites routinely purchased black votes to control elections, and it was easier to disenfranchise blacks than to go after powerful white men.

In the Northern states, progressives such as Robert M. La Follette and William Simon U'Ren argued that the average citizen should have more control over his government. The Oregon System of "Initiative, Referendum, and Recall" was exported to many states, including Idaho, Washington and Wisconsin. Many progressives such as George M. Forbes, president of Rochester's Board of Education, hoped to make government in the United States more responsive to the direct voice of the American people, arguing:

[W]e are now intensely occupied in forging the tools of democracy, the direct primary, the initiative, the referendum, the recall, the short ballot, commission government. But in our enthusiasm we do not seem to be aware that these tools will be worthless unless they are used by those who are aflame with the sense of brotherhood. [...] The idea [of the social centers movement is] to establish in each community an institution having a direct and vital relation to the welfare of the neighborhood, ward, or district, and also to the city as a whole

Philip J. Ethington seconds this high view of direct democracy, saying that "initiatives, referendums, and recalls, along with direct primaries and the direct election of US Senators, were the core achievements of 'direct democracy' by the Progressive generation during the first two decades of the twentieth century".

Progressives fought for women's suffrage to purify the elections using supposedly purer female voters. Progressives in the South supported the elimination of supposedly corrupt black voters from the election booth. Historian Michael Perman says that in both Texas and Georgia "disfranchisement was the weapon as well as the rallying cry in the fight for reform". In Virginia, "the drive for disfranchisement had been initiated by men who saw themselves as reformers, even progressives".

While the ultimate significance of the progressive movement on today's politics is still up for debate, Alonzo L. Hamby asks:
What were the central themes that emerged from the cacophony [of progressivism]? Democracy or elitism? Social justice or social control? Small entrepreneurship or concentrated capitalism? And what was the impact of American foreign policy? Were the progressives isolationists or interventionists? Imperialists or advocates of national self-determination? And whatever they were, what was their motivation? Moralistic utopianism? Muddled relativistic pragmatism? Hegemonic capitalism? Not surprisingly many battered scholars began to shout 'no mas!' In 1970, Peter Filene declared that the term 'progressivism' had become meaningless.

Municipal administration 
The progressives typically concentrated on city and state government, looking for waste and better ways to provide services as the cities grew rapidly. These changes led to a more structured system, power that had been centralized within the legislature would now be more locally focused. The changes were made to the system to effectively make legal processes, market transactions, bureaucratic administration and democracy easier to manage, putting them under the classification of "Municipal Administration". There was also a change in authority for this system as it was believed that the authority that was not properly organized had now given authority to professionals, experts and bureaucrats for these services. These changes led to a more solid type of municipal administration compared to the old system that was underdeveloped and poorly constructed.

The progressives mobilized concerned middle class voters as well as newspapers and magazines to identify problems and concentrate reform sentiment on specific problems. Many Protestants focused on the saloon as the power base for corruption as well as violence and family disruption, so they tried to get rid of the entire saloon system through prohibition. Others such as Jane Addams in Chicago promoted settlement houses. Early municipal reformers included Hazen S. Pingree (mayor of Detroit in the 1890s) and Tom L. Johnson in Cleveland, Ohio. In 1901, Johnson won election as mayor of Cleveland on a platform of just taxation, home rule for Ohio cities and a 3-cent streetcar fare. Columbia University President Seth Low was elected mayor of New York City in 1901 on a reform ticket.

Conservation 
During the term of the progressive President Theodore Roosevelt (1901–1909) and influenced by the ideas of philosopher-scientists such as George Perkins Marsh, William John McGee, John Muir, John Wesley Powell and Lester Frank Ward, the largest government-funded conservation-related projects in United States history were undertaken.

National parks and wildlife refuges 

On March 14, 1903, President Roosevelt created the first National Bird Preserve, the beginning of the Wildlife Refuge system, on Pelican Island, Florida. In all, by 1909, the Roosevelt administration had created an unprecedented 42 million acres (170,000 km2) of United States National Forests, 53 National Wildlife Refuges and 18 areas of "special interest" such as the Grand Canyon.

Reclamation 
In addition, Roosevelt approved the Newlands Reclamation Act of 1902 which gave subsidies for irrigation in 13 (eventually 20) Western states. Another conservation-oriented bill was the Antiquities Act of 1906 that protected large areas of land by allowing the president to declare areas meriting protection to be national monuments. The Inland Waterways Commission was appointed by Roosevelt on March 14, 1907, to study the river systems of the United States, including the development of water power, flood control and land reclamation.

National politics 
In the early 20th century, politicians of the Democratic and Republican parties, Lincoln–Roosevelt League Republicans (in California) and Theodore Roosevelt's Progressive ("Bull Moose") Party all pursued environmental, political and economic reforms. Chief among these aims was the pursuit of trust busting, the breaking up very large monopolies and support for labor unions, public health programs, decreased corruption in politics and environmental conservation.

The progressive movement enlisted support from both major parties and from minor parties as well. One leader, the Democratic William Jennings Bryan, had won both the Democratic Party and the Populist Party nominations in 1896. At the time, the great majority of other major leaders had been opposed to populism. When Roosevelt left the Republican Party in 1912, he took with him many of the intellectual leaders of progressivism, but very few political leaders. The Republican Party then became notably more committed to business-oriented and efficiency-oriented progressivism, typified by Herbert Hoover and William Howard Taft.

Culture 
The foundation of the progressive tendency was indirectly linked to the unique philosophy of pragmatism which was primarily developed by John Dewey and William James.

Equally significant to progressive-era reform were the crusading journalists known as muckrakers. These journalists publicized to middle class readers economic privilege, political corruption and social injustice. Their articles appeared in McClure's Magazine and other reform periodicals. Some muckrakers focused on corporate abuses. Ida Tarbell exposed the activities of the Standard Oil Company. In The Shame of the Cities (1904), Lincoln Steffens dissected corruption in city government. In Following the Color Line (1908), Ray Stannard Baker criticized race relations. Other muckrakers assailed the Senate, railroad companies, insurance companies and fraud in patent medicine.

Novelists criticized corporate injustices. Theodore Dreiser drew harsh portraits of a type of ruthless businessman in The Financier (1912) and The Titan (1914). In The Jungle (1906), Socialist Upton Sinclair repelled readers with descriptions of Chicago's meatpacking plants and his work led to support for remedial food safety legislation.

Leading intellectuals also shaped the progressive mentality. In Dynamic Sociology (1883), Lester Frank Ward laid out the philosophical foundations of the progressive movement and attacked the laissez-faire policies advocated by Herbert Spencer and William Graham Sumner. In The Theory of the Leisure Class (1899), Thorstein Veblen attacked the "conspicuous consumption" of the wealthy. Educator John Dewey emphasized a child-centered philosophy of pedagogy known as progressive education which affected schoolrooms for three generations.

In the 21st century 
Modern progressivism can be seen as encompassing many notable differences from the historical progressivism of the 19th–20th centuries. Some viewpoints of modern progressivism highlight these perceived differences like those of Princeton economics professor Thomas C. Leonard who viewed historical progressivism in The American Conservative as being "[a]t a glance, [...] not much here for 21st-century progressives to claim kinship with. Today's progressives emphasize racial equality and minority rights, decry U.S. imperialism, shun biological ideas in social science, and have little use for piety or proselytizing". Ultimately however, both historical progressivism and the modern movement share the notion that the free markets lead to economic inequalities that must be ameliorated in order to best protect the American working class.

Mitigating income inequality 
Income inequality in the United States has been on the rise since 1970. Progressives argue that lower union rates, weak policy, globalization and other drivers have caused the gap in income. The rise of income inequality has led progressives to draft legislation including, but not limited to, reforming Wall Street, reforming the tax code, reforming campaign finance, closing loopholes and keeping domestic work.

Wall Street reform 
Progressives began to demand stronger Wall Street regulation after they perceived deregulation and relaxed enforcement as leading to the financial crisis of 2008. Passing the Dodd-Frank financial regulatory act in 2010 provided increased oversight on financial institutions and the creation of new regulatory agencies, but many progressives argue its broad framework allows for financial institutions to continue to take advantage of consumers and the government. Among others, Bernie Sanders has argued for reimplementing Glass-Steagall, which regulated banking more strictly, and for breaking up financial institutions where market-share is concentrated in a select few 'too big to fail' corporations.

Health care reform 

In 2009, the Congressional Progressive Caucus (CPC) outlined five key healthcare principles they intended to pass into law. The CPC mandated a nationwide public option, affordable health insurance, insurance market regulations, an employer insurance provision mandate and comprehensive services for children. In March 2010, Congress passed the Patient Protection and Affordable Care Act which was intended to increase the affordability and efficiency of the United States healthcare system. Although considered a success by progressives, many argued that it did not go far enough in achieving healthcare reform as exemplified with the Democrats' failure in achieving a national public option. In recent decades, single-payer healthcare has become an important goal in healthcare reform for progressives. In the 2016 Democratic Party primaries, progressive presidential candidate Bernie Sanders raised the issue of a single-payer healthcare system, citing his belief that millions of Americans are still paying too much for health insurance and arguing that millions more do not receive the care they need. In November 2016, an effort was made to implement a single-payer healthcare system in the state of Colorado, known as ColoradoCare (Amendment 69). Senator Sanders held rallies in Colorado in support of Amendment 69 leading up to the vote. Despite high-profile support, Amendment 69 failed to pass, with just 21.23% of voting Colorado residents voting in favor and 78.77% against.

Minimum wage 
Adjusted for inflation, the minimum wage peaked in 1968 at around $9.90 an hour in 2020 dollars. Progressives believe that stagnating wages perpetuate income inequality and that raising the minimum wage is a necessary step to combat inequality. If the minimum wage grew at the rate of productivity growth in the United States, it would be $21.72 an hour, nearly three times as much as the current $7.25 an hour. Popular progressives such as Senator Bernie Sanders and Representative Alexandria Ocasio-Cortez have endorsed a federally mandated wage increase to $15 an hour. The movement has already seen success with its implementation in California with the passing of bill to raise the minimum wage $1 every year until reaching $15 an hour in 2021. New York workers are lobbying for similar legislation as many continue to rally for a minimum wage increase as part of the Fight for $15 movement.

Environmental justice 

Modern progressives advocate strong environmental protections and measures to reduce or eliminate pollution. One reason for this is the strong link between economic injustice and adverse environmental conditions as groups that are economically marginalized tend to be disproportionately affected by the harms of pollution and environmental degradation.

Definition 
With the rise in popularity of progressives such as Alexandria Ocasio-Cortez, Bernie Sanders, and Elizabeth Warren, the term progressive began to carry greater cultural currency, particularly in the 2016 Democratic primaries. While answering a question from CNN moderator Anderson Cooper regarding her willingness to shift positions during an October 2015 debate, Hillary Clinton referred to herself as a "progressive who likes to get things done", drawing the ire of a number of Sanders supporters and other critics from her left. Questions about the precise meaning of the term have persisted within the Democratic Party and without since the election of Donald Trump in the 2016 United States presidential election, with some candidates using it to indicate their affiliation with the left flank of the party.

Progressive parties 
Following the first progressive movement of the early 20th century, two later short-lived parties have also identified as progressive.

Progressive Party, 1912 

The first political party named the Progressive Party was formed for the 1912 presidential election to elect Theodore Roosevelt. It was formed after Roosevelt lost his bid to become the Republican candidate to William Howard Taft, and became defunct by 1920.

Progressive Party, 1924 

In 1924, Wisconsin Senator Robert M. La Follette ran for president on the Progressive Party ticket. La Follette won the support of labor unions, German Americans, and socialists by his crusade. He carried only Wisconsin, and the party vanished elsewhere. In Wisconsin, it remained a force until the 1940s.

Progressive Party, 1948 

A third party was initiated in 1948 by former Vice President Henry A. Wallace as a vehicle for his campaign for president. He saw the two parties as reactionary and war-mongering, and attracted support from left-wing voters who opposed the Cold War policies that had become a national consensus. Most liberals, New Dealers and especially the Congress of Industrial Organizations, denounced the party because in their view it was increasingly controlled by "Communists". It faded away after winning 2% of the vote in 1948.

Farmer–Labor Parties

See also 
 Center for American Progress
 Democratic socialism
 Environmental justice
 Modern liberalism in the United States
 Occupy movement
 Progress
 Social democracy
 Social justice
 Social liberalism
Progressivism
Labor history of the United States

References

Further reading

Overview 

 Buenker, John D., John C. Burnham, and Robert M. Crunden. Progressivism (1986) short overview
 Buenker, John D. and Joseph Buenker, eds. Encyclopedia of the Gilded Age and Progressive Era. (2005) 1290 pp. in three volumes. 900 articles by 200 scholars
 Buenker, John D. ed. Dictionary of the Progressive Era (1980), short articles by scholars
 Chambers, John Whiteclay II. The Tyranny of Change: America in the Progressive Era, 1890–1920 (2000), textbook excerpt and text search 
 Crunden, Robert M. Ministers of Reform: The Progressives' Achievement in American Civilization, 1889–1920 (1982) excerpt and text search 
 Dawley, Alan. Changing the World: American Progressives in War and Revolution (2003) excerpt and text search 
 Diner, Steven J. A Very Different Age: Americans of the Progressive Era (1998) excerpt and text search 
 Flanagan, Maureen. America Reformed: Progressives and Progressivisms, 1890s–1920s (2007).
 Gilmore, Glenda Elizabeth. Who Were the Progressives? (2002)
 Gould, Lewis L. America in the Progressive Era, 1890–1914 (2000) excerpt and text search 
 Gould, Lewis L. ed., The Progressive Era (1974), essays by scholars
 Hays, Samuel P. The Response to Industrialism, 1885–1914 (1957), old but influential short survey
 Hofstadter, Richard The Age of Reform (1954), Pulitzer Prize, but now sadly outdated
 Jensen, Richard. "Democracy, Republicanism and Efficiency: The Values of American Politics, 1885–1930," in Byron Shafer and Anthony Badger, eds, Contesting Democracy: Substance and Structure in American Political History, 1775–2000 (U of Kansas Press, 2001) pp. 149–80; online version 
 Johnston, Robert D. "Re-Democratizing the Progressive Era: The Politics of Progressive Era Political Historiography," Journal of the Gilded Age and Progressive Era (2002) 1#1 pp. 68–92
 Kennedy, David M. ed., Progressivism: The Critical Issues (1971), readings
 Kloppenberg, James T. Uncertain victory: social democracy and progressivism in European and American thought, 1870–1920 1986 online at ACLS e-books
 Leuchtenburg, William E. "Progressivism and Imperialism: The Progressive Movement and American Foreign Policy, 1898–1916," The Mississippi Valley Historical Review, Vol. 39, No. 3. (Dec., 1952), pp. 483–504. JSTOR 
 Lears, T. J. Jackson. Rebirth of a Nation: The Remaking of Modern America, 1877-1920 (2009) excerpt and text search 
 Link, Arthur S. Woodrow Wilson and the Progressive Era: 1913–1917 (1954), standard scholarly survey
 Link, Arthur S. Wilson: The Road to the White House (1947), first volume of standard biography (to 1917); Wilson: The New Freedom (1956); Wilson: The Struggle for Neutrality: 1914–1915 (1960); Wilson: Confusions and Crises: 1915–1916 (1964); Wilson: Campaigns for Progressivism and Peace: 1916–1917 (1965), the last volume of standard biography. all 5 volumes are online free (if you have an account) at ACLS e-books 
 Mann, Arthur. ed., The Progressive Era (1975), readings from scholars
 Lasch, Christopher. The True and Only Heaven: Progress and its Critics (1991) excerpt and text search 
 McGerr, Michael. A Fierce Discontent: The Rise and Fall of the Progressive Movement in America, 1870–1920 (2003) excerpt and text search 
 Mowry, George. The Era of Theodore Roosevelt and the Birth of Modern America, 1900–1912. (1954) general survey of era
 Noggle, Burl. "The Twenties: A New Historiographical Frontier," The Journal of American History, Vol. 53, No. 2. (Sep., 1966), pp. 299–314. in JSTOR 
 Painter, Nell Irvin. Standing at Armageddon: The United States, 1877-1919 (1987) excerpt and text search 
 Perry, Elisabeth Israels and Karen Manners Smith, eds. The Gilded Age & Progressive Era: A Student Companion (2006)
 Piott, Steven. American Reformers 1870–1920 (2006). 240 pp. biographies of 12 leaders online review 
 Rodgers, Daniel T.  Atlantic Crossings: Social Politics in a Progressive Age (2000). stresses links with Europe online edition 
 Schutz, Aaron. Social Class, Social Action, and Education: The Failure of Progressive Democracy. (2010) introduction 
 Stromquist, Shelton. Reinventing "the People": The Progressive Movement, the Class Problem and the Origins of Modern Liberalism (2006) excerpt and text search 
 Thelen, David P. "Social Tensions and the Origins of Progressivism," Journal of American History 56 (1969), 323–341 JSTOR 
 Wiebe, Robert. The Search For Order, 1877–1920 (1967) highly influential interpretation
 Young, Jeremy C. The Age of Charisma: Leaders, Followers, and Emotions in American Society, 1870-1940 (2017) excerpt and text search

National politics 

 Blum, John Morton The Republican Roosevelt. (1954). Series of essays that examine how TR did politics
 Brands, H.W. Theodore Roosevelt (2001), biography online edition 
 Buenker, John D. and Joseph Buenker, eds. Encyclopedia of the Gilded Age and Progressive Era. Sharpe Reference, 2005. xxxii + 1256 pp. in three volumes. . 900 articles by 200 scholars
 Buenker, John D., ed. Dictionary of the Progressive Era (1980)
 Cocks, Catherine, Peter C. Holloran and Alan Lessoff. Historical Dictionary of the Progressive Era (2009)
 Clements, Kendrick A. The Presidency of Woodrow Wilson (1992) excerpt and text search 
 Coletta, Paolo. The Presidency of William Howard Taft (1990) excerpt and text search 
 Cooper, John Milton The Warrior and the Priest: Woodrow Wilson and Theodore Roosevelt. (1983), influential dual biography excerpt and text search 
 Edwards, Barry C. "Putting Hoover on the Map: Was the 31st President a Progressive?." Congress & the Presidency 41#1 (2014) pp 49–83  online 
 Gould, Lewis L. The Presidency of Theodore Roosevelt (1991) excerpt and text search 
 Harrison, Robert. Congress, Progressive Reform, and the New American State (2004) excerpt and text search 
 Hofstadter, Richard. The American Political Tradition (1948), ch. 8–10 on Bryan, Roosevelt and Wilson. excerpt and text search 
 Link, Arthur Stanley. Woodrow Wilson and the Progressive Era, 1910–1917 (1972), standard history
 Morris, Edmund Theodore Rex. (2001), very well written biography of Theodore Roosevelt covers 1901–1909 excerpt and text search
 Mowry, George E. Theodore Roosevelt and the Progressive Movement. (2001) standard history of 1912 movement
 Sanders, Elizabeth. Roots of Reform: Farmers, Workers and the American State, 1877–1917 (1999) excerpt and text search 
 ;  904pp; full scale scholarly biography; winner of Pulitzer Prize; online free 2nd ed. 1965

External links 
 
 "The Fifty Most Influential Progressives of the Twentieth Century" — Part I, Part II, Part III, slideshows by The Nation

 
History of the United States by topic
Political history of the United States
Progressive Era in the United States